City in the Sky is an album by American music group the Staple Singers, released in 1974. It was the group's final album for Stax Records. The 1990s reissue appended bonus tracks from the group's set at Wattstax.

The album peaked at No. 125 on the Billboard 200.

Production
City in the Sky was recorded at Ardent Studios in October 1972, during sessions that were originally undertaken in order to construct a double album. It was produced by Al Bell.

Critical reception

Robert Christgau called City in the Sky the group's "toughest and best Stax LP," writing that "though their social vision may be vague, at least they were political before it was commercial, which gives them an edge."

Reviewing a reissue, The Commercial Appeal wrote that "it's one classic interpretation after another with brilliant socio-political numbers like 'Back Road Into Town', 'Washington We're Watching You' and 'Something Ain't Right'." Record Collector deemed it "a solid soul album without making too many claims to be essential."

Track listing

Personnel
Pop Staples - vocals, guitar
Cleotha Staples - vocals
Mavis Staples - vocals
Yvonne Staples - vocals

References

1974 albums
The Staple Singers albums
Stax Records albums